Polynesia truncapex is a moth in the family Geometridae first described by Charles Swinhoe in 1892. It is found in the north-eastern Himalayas and on Peninsular Malaysia and Bali.

Adults have primrose-yellow wings marked with punctate red fasciae.

References

Moths described in 1892
Asthenini